Jamie Thackray (born 30 September 1979), also known by the nickname of "Thackers", is a Great Britain international rugby league footballer who plays for Whitehaven in the Betfred Championship.

Thackray made his career high number of appearances for Hull FC over two different spells and also played more than fifty times for each of Hunslet Hawks, Halifax and Workington.

He was also a first team regular for a season or two at Castleford, Leeds, Crusaders, Barrow, London Broncos and Doncaster.

He also played a handful of games for the likes of Limoux, Atherton Roosters and Tumut and the odd game on loan to a few other clubs such as South Wales, London Skolars plus repeatedly Doncaster.

A former Great Britain international, Thackray has played for several teams over his career. 

After extended stints with Halifax and Hunslet, Thackray moved to Castleford (Heritage № 796). During these seasons, Thackray played some games as a  before settling into his permanent role as a prop forward.

Thackray played for Hull in the 2005 Challenge Cup Final from the interchange bench in their victory against the Leeds Rhinos. 
After Castleford, Thackray moved to Hull FC, Leeds, and back again.  This time also included a month-long loan to Doncaster in the Northern Rail Cup. At the end of the 2009 season, Thackray was released by Hull. In early 2010, Thackray signed for Crusaders RL. Within a fortnight, he made his début for Crusaders against his former team, Leeds and went on to appear 20 times for the Welsh outfit during their Super League campaign.

On 12 November 2010, it was announced that he had joined Super League hopefuls Barrow for the 2011 Championship campaign.

In 2012 he joined Workington Town.

Thackray played for the London Broncos in the Kingstone Press Championship.

References

External links
(archived by web.archive.org) Crusaders profile
(archived by web.archive.org) Hunslet profile
Thackray Joins Tigers
Hull seal Thackray signing
Thackray makes early Leeds move
Rhinos squad: Jamie Thackray
Thackray returns to help out for Broncos
Workington sign ex-Great Britain prop Jamie Thackray

1979 births
Living people
Barrow Raiders players
Castleford Tigers players
Crusaders Rugby League players
Doncaster R.L.F.C. players
English rugby league players
English rugby union players
Great Britain national rugby league team players
Halifax R.L.F.C. players
Hull F.C. players
Hunslet R.L.F.C. players
Keighley Cougars players
Leeds Rhinos players
Limoux Grizzlies players
London Broncos players
London Skolars players
People from Rothwell, West Yorkshire
Rugby league players from Leeds
Rugby league props
Rugby union players from Leeds
South Wales Scorpions players
Whitehaven R.L.F.C. players
Workington Town players